is a railway station on the Kōnan Railway Kōnan Line in the village of Inakadate, Minamitsugaru District, Aomori Prefecture, Japan, operated by the private railway operator Konan Railway.

Lines

Station layout
The station has a single island platform serving two tracks connected to the station building by a level crossing. It is unattended.

Platforms

Adjacent stations

History
Inakadate Station opened on July 1, 1950. The station has been unattended since November 1, 1987.

Passenger statistics
In fiscal 2011, the station was used by an average of 128 passengers daily.

Surrounding area

See also
 List of railway stations in Japan

References

External links

 

Railway stations in Aomori Prefecture
Konan Railway
Railway stations in Japan opened in 1950
Inakadate, Aomori